Upreti or sometimes spelled Uprety (ISO: Upretī), is a surname found in the Hindu community of Kumaoni Chettri, primarily living in the Kumaon region of Uttarakhand state of India and all over Nepal. A few members of this community are found in Uttar Pradesh, Delhi, Madhya Pradesh, Rajasthan, Sikkim and some other states of India too.

According to their traditions they are the descendants of the sage Mudgala, the teacher of Hindu deity Ganesha and the one who introduced Om in his teachings to Ganesha. Adherent of Shaivism sect, they worship Shiva as their prime deity.

Etymology
According to Badri Datt Pandey's book Kumaon Ka Itihas where he quotes Pandit Rudra Datt Pant, 
(pp. 572) - "During the times of the Katyuri kings, from the Chauki village of Doti, a Kanyakubja Brahmin named Shambhu Sharma came to Kali Kumaon and settled in Uprara village of Pithoragarh district, hence the descendants were called Upretis."

According to another source, around 450 A.D. to 550 A.D. Lalchan Bhatta came to Achham District in Nepal from Vidyanagar, Jalandhar to serve a new king. The highly sought yogi was rewarded as Royal Priest by the king. During his tenure as a Royal Priest he didn't take any money nor gifts. Due to this the king awarded the great priest the Uparati title. This was the highest title awarded by that king at that time. Therefore, Uparati is meant as someone who is literate and has no desire for earthly wonders. Later on, the word Uparati corrupted to form Upreti.

According to an interview with Yogi Narhari Nath in 1996 he stated that, ‘Upreti is not just a caste or a clan but it is an award.’ According to him, there used to live a sage named Mudgala in Mugu District of Nepal. It is said that during the Ashvamedha Yajna of Baliraja the chief priest (Purohit) was Vashishtha while secondary priests (Upa-purohita) were the descendants of Mudgala. Therefore, it is also thought that the word Upa-purohita was twisted to make the surname Upreti.

History
In the same section of his book, Badri Datt Pandey mentions about the famous Pandit Ram Datt Jyotirvidji,
who says that Uprara/Upretyara, the estate of the then royal priests Upretis in Gangolihat was given to the Dravida Vajpayee Brahmin Shivaprasad who came to Kumaon during the reign of Mankoti kings.

During the time of the Gorkhas, Pandit Jayakrishna Upreti was a famous General whose descendants continue to live in Almora.

Badri Datt Pandey mentions that within Kumaoni Brahmins, the Upretis of Patiya, Jhijhar, and Supakot have a common descent, whereas other Upreti's belong to a different group (pp. 572).

He also quotes that Pandit Ganga Datt Upreti claims that a few Upretis are also the original inhabitants of Maharashtra state of the Western India region who later migrated to the Kumaon region.

Thus those who claim to have Kanyakubja origins would have migrated to the Himalaya during the Islamic invasions of the twelfth century, whereas the one from Maharashtra would have moved northward along with the Marathas in the seventeenth century. The former seems more plausible as the Chand dynasty who ruled the Kumaon Kingdom from the tenth century onward, after the reign of the Katyuris, came from Kannauj.

They also migrated to Nepal along with other Brahmins from Pithoragarh district under the royal patronage of the Hindu Kingdom when the Kumaon region was under the control of the Gorkhas till the Treaty of Sugauli with British India in 1815 A.D.

Notable people with Upreti as a surname
 Almoda Rana Uprety; Nepalese singer and musician 
 Arun Kumar Upreti, Indian politician
 Bharat Raj Upreti; Former judge of the Supreme Court of Nepal
 Bishal Nath Upreti; Nepalese academician 
 Dalip Kumar Upreti; Indian lichenologist
 Kharananda Upreti; Indian politician
 Kul Prasad Uprety, Nepalese politician
 Mohan Upreti; Indian playwright and theater personality
 Nikhil Upreti; Nepalese actor
 Nilkantha Upreti; Former Chief Election Commissioner of Nepal
 Sanjeev Uprety; Nepalese journalist

See also

 Bahun
 Kumaoni language

References

Indian surnames
Surnames of Indian origin
Surnames of Hindustani origin
Nepali-language surnames
Hindu surnames
Himalayan peoples
Social groups of India
Social groups of Nepal
Social groups of Uttarakhand
Brahmin communities of Nepal
Brahmin communities of Uttarakhand
Khas surnames